The canton of Moustiers-Sainte-Marie is a former administrative division in southeastern France. It was disbanded following the French canton reorganisation which came into effect in March 2015. It consisted of 3 communes, which joined the canton of Riez in 2015. It had 1,168 inhabitants (2012).

The canton comprised the following communes:
Moustiers-Sainte-Marie
La Palud-sur-Verdon
Saint-Jurs

Demographics

See also
Cantons of the Alpes-de-Haute-Provence department

References

Former cantons of Alpes-de-Haute-Provence
2015 disestablishments in France
States and territories disestablished in 2015